Urk is a municipality and a town in the Flevoland province in the central Netherlands.

Urk is first mentioned in historical records dating to the 10th century, when it was still an island in the Zuiderzee, an inland sea that would become part of the IJsselmeer in the 13th century after a series of incursions by the North Sea. In 1939, a dike from the mainland to Urk ended the town's island status, just as the Afsluitdijk project was changing the salt water Zuiderzee surrounding Urk to the less saline IJsselmeer. Later in the 20th century, seabed areas surrounding Urk were reclaimed from the sea to become the Noordoostpolder.

The mainstay of the town's formal economy has always been fishing, and the products of the sea coming in through Urk harbor continue to be exported widely, although today Urk's fishing boats must travel greater distances to gather them than was required in most historical periods.
Religious life has traditionally been very important to Urk's inhabitants, with active, conservative congregations of the Dutch Reformed denominations playing key roles in the life of the community.

Geography 

Towards the north, the IJsselmeer is enclosed by an arc of boulder clay high areas of land which formed during an ice age glaciations of the Pleistocene epoch: Texel, Wieringen, Urk, de Voorst, and Gaasterland. To the south of that arc a lake formed as a result of meltwater, which became known as Almere. North of the boulder clay highland of Urk, the Vecht river flowed into the Almere, while the river IJssel with tributaries flowed into the south of Urk. As the climate became warmer during the Middle Ages, the sea level rose whilst the surrounding areas have been slowly steadily sinking because of forebulge effect since the end of the Ice Age. During the 13th century (and especially after a large storm in 1282) the Zuiderzee formed, and the water round Urk suddenly became a tidal sea. Because there was no sea defense, over time large pieces of the island eroded. The southwest side of Urk, which rose perpendicularly out of the sea, was called het Hoge Klif ("the High Cliff"). Around 1700 the municipality of Amsterdam donated sea defenses to Urk. The town contains the highest point in the province of Flevoland.

History 

The oldest instance of the name "Urk" is a donation certificate of 966 from Holy Roman Emperor Otto I to the Sint Pantaleonsklooster monastery in Cologne. The text reads: cuiisdam insulae medietatem in Almere, que Urch vocatur (Latin: "of a certain island in the middle of Almere, which is called Urch"). Until 1475 the High and Low Lordship of Urk and Emmeloord (the most northern village of Schokland) was in the hands of the Van Kuinre family. From 1475 to 1614, the Zoudenbalch family of Utrecht were Lords of Urk and Emmeloord. From 1614 to 1660, Urk and Emmeloord were ruled by the van der Werve from Antwerp. From 1660 to 1792 Urk and Emmeloord belonged to the municipality of Amsterdam, and ruled from 1660 to 1672/1678 by Andries de Graeff. From 1792 to 1950 Urk belonged to the province of North Holland.

After World War II, Urk ceased to be an island, and Urk's town expanded into the reclaimed land of the polder. Many Urkers who previously left the town because of overcrowding before the polder reclamation was completed were able to return to Urk. From 1950 to 1986 Urk belonged to the province of Overijssel. Since 1986, Urk has belonged to the province of Flevoland.

The Noordoostpolder in its early years had an alternative name "Urker Land," from which Urk's newspaper, Het Urkerland, gets its name.

Economy 

The important economic pillar of the village remains fishery. After the IJsselmeer was formed, the Urkers moved their fishing operations to the North Sea. Additionally, Urk is focused on making a connection between the existing economy and new activities such as tourism, social care, maritime industry and services. The local council is keen to particularly promote tourism, retail and fisheries. In the past, many lives were lost in storms on the Zuiderzee and North Sea. There is a memorial to lost fishermen on Urk, popularly known as the Urker vrouw: a statue of a woman looking out to sea, vainly awaiting the return of her husband and sons.

Politics

Local

The municipal council currently (2021) contains five political parties:
Christian Union: 3 seats
CDA: 3 seats
Hart voor Urk: 3 seats
SGP: 6 seats
Gemeentebelangen: 2 seats 
PVV: 1 seat
Krachtig Urk: 1 seat
Gemeentebelangen, Hart voor Urk and Krachtig Urk are local parties. Hart voor Urk was founded by former SGP councillor Jan Koffeman with largely identical party policies to SGP's.

A majority coalition of ChristenUnie, SGP and Hart voor Urk are currently in power. The town council is led by (non-elected) mayor Cees van den Bos.

None of these parties can be described as either left-wing (socialist) or liberal. National parties such as the VVD (conservative/liberal), D66 (liberal), GroenLinks (green party) and PvdA (labour) are not represented in Urk's town council and support for these parties in national and regional elections remains minimal. However, due to slowly growing support for the VVD, an Urk affiliate of the conservative/liberal party was founded in early 2011 and entered the 2014 local elections. However, the VVD only drew 2.7% of the vote, insufficient for a seat.

National
Urk is one of the most politically conservative areas in the Netherlands. As part of the so-called Dutch "Bible belt", a vast majority of election votes go to the three Christian parties in the Netherlands, SGP, ChristenUnie and CDA. Urk is also known for its high turnout at each election, which is usually considerably higher than the national average (although general turnout percentages have dropped approx. 10% since 2002).

Voting patterns used to be relatively stable, with approximately 85-90% of the votes spread out evenly over SGP, ChristenUnie and CDA (each between 25-35%). CDA in Urk usually got more votes in national elections than in local elections, while ChristenUnie's support is sometimes twice locally compared to what it receives from Urk voters in national elections (this is sometimes attributed to the apparent left-wing leanings of the ChristenUnie nationally, while ChristenUnie in Urk tends to be more conservative). SGP's support locally is not much different from its support in national elections.

However, in recent years a few changes in voting patterns occurred, such as a growing support for national protest parties such as the LPF or Geert Wilders' PVV Freedom Party. Also, voting patterns these days tend to show bigger swings, as shown in 2010's and 2012's national elections in which CDA lost 11% and 13% respectively, and in 2011's regional elections, in which ChristenUnie lost 18%. In 2012, orthodox-Christian SGP even registered an absolute majority with 51.2% of the vote. (In the European Elections of 2014, the combined ChristenUnie/SGP list even registered 78% of the vote).

Support for established left wing parties, such as the Labour Party or the Socialist Party, remains minimal.

|-
!style="background-color:#E9E9E9" align=left colspan="2" valign=top|Parties
!style="background-color:#E9E9E9" align=center valign=top|Political Ideology
!style="background-color:#E9E9E9" align=left valign=top width=100|Top candidate
!style="background-color:#E9E9E9" align=center valign=top|Votes
!style="background-color:#E9E9E9" align=right valign=top|Vote %
!style="background-color:#E9E9E9" align=right valign=top|+/- %
|- align=right
| 
|align=left|Reformed Political Party  (Staatkundig Gereformeerde Partij, SGP)
|align="left"|Conservatism, Reformed Christian
|align="left" |Kees van der Staaij
|align="right" |6635
|align="right" |56.1%
|align="right" |+4.9%
|- align=right
| 
|align=left|Party for Freedom  (Partij voor de Vrijheid, PVV)
|align=left|Right-wing populism/Anti-Islam
|align="left" |Geert Wilders
|align="right" |
|align="right" |11.0%
|align="right" |+2.2%
|- align=right
| 
|align=left|Christian Democratic Appeal  (Christen-Democratisch Appèl, CDA)
|align=left|Christian Democracy
|align=left|Sybrand Buma
|align="right" |1680
|align="right" |14.2%
|align="right" |+1.5%
|- align=right
| 
|align=left|ChristianUnion  (ChristenUnie, CU)
|align=left|Social-Christianity /Orthodox Protestantism
|align="left" |Gert-Jan Segers
|align="right" |1376
|align="right" |11.6%
|align="right" |-6.4%
|- align=right
| 
|align=left|People's Party for Freedom and Democracy  (Volkspartij voor Vrijheid en Democratie, VVD)
|align=left|Conservative liberalism/Liberalism
|align=left|Mark Rutte
|align="right" |210
|align="right" |1.8%
|align="right" |-4.5%
|- align=right
| 
|align=left|Socialist Party  (Socialistische Partij, SP)
|align=left|Socialism
|align="left" |Emile Roemer
|align="right" |78
|align="right" |0.7%
|align="right" |-0%
|- align=right
| 
|align=left|Democrats 66  (Democraten 66, D66)
|align=left|Social liberalism, Radicalism, Progressivism
|align="left" |Alexander Pechtold
|align="right" |58
|align="right" |0.5%
|align="right" |+0.3%
|- align=right
| 
|align=left|GreenLeft  (GroenLinks, GL)
|align=left|Green Politics
|align="left" |Jesse Klaver
|align="right" |29
|align="right" |0.2%
|align="right" |+0.1%
|- align=right
| 
|align=left|Party for the Animals  (Partij voor de Dieren, PvdD)
|align=left|Animal rights/Animal welfare
|align="left" |Marianne Thieme
|align="right" |22
|align="right" |0.2%
|align="right" |+0.0%
|- align=right
| 
|align=left|Labour Party  (Partij van de Arbeid, PvdA)
|align=left|Social Democracy
|align=left|Lodewijk Asscher 
|align="right" |19
|align="right" |0.2%
|align="right" |-0.8%
|- align=right
|bgcolor="darkgray"|
|align=left|Other 
|align="left" |–
|align="left" |–
|align="right" |399
|align="right" |3.4%
|align="right" |+2.7%
|-
|align=left colspan=2 style="background-color:#E9E9E9"|Total
|width="30" align="right" style="background-color:#E9E9E9"|
|width="30" align="right" style="background-color:#E9E9E9"|
|width="75" align="right" style="background-color:#E9E9E9"|11,810
|width="30" align="right" style="background-color:#E9E9E9"|–
|width="30" align="right" style="background-color:#E9E9E9"|–
|-
|align=left colspan=2 style="background-color:#E9E9E9"|Turnout
|width="30" align="right" style="background-color:#E9E9E9"|
|width="30" align="right" style="background-color:#E9E9E9"|
|width="75" align="right" style="background-color:#E9E9E9"|10,094
|width="30" align="right" style="background-color:#E9E9E9"|82.72%
|width="30" align="right" style="background-color:#E9E9E9"|+2.80%
|-
|align="left" colspan=7|Source: 
|}

|-
!style="background-color:#E9E9E9" align=left colspan="2" valign=top|Parties
!style="background-color:#E9E9E9" align=center valign=top|Political Ideology
!style="background-color:#E9E9E9" align=left valign=top width=100|Top candidate
!style="background-color:#E9E9E9" align=center valign=top|Votes
!style="background-color:#E9E9E9" align=right valign=top|Vote %
!style="background-color:#E9E9E9" align=right valign=top|+/- %
|- align=right
| 
|align=left|Reformed Political Party  (Staatkundig Gereformeerde Partij, SGP)
|align="left"|Conservatism, Reformed Christian
|align="left" |Kees van der Staaij
|align="right" |
|align="right" |54.4%
|align="right" |-2.0%
|- align=right
| 
|align=left|Party for Freedom  (Partij voor de Vrijheid, PVV)
|align=left|Right-wing populism/Anti-Islam
|align="left" |Geert Wilders
|align="right" |
|align="right" |13.8%
|align="right" |+2.8%
|- align=right
| 
|align=left|Forum for Democracy  (Forum voor Democratie, FvD)
|align=left|Right-wing populism/Anti-Islam
|align="left" |Thierry Baudet
|align="right" |
|align="right" |9.0%
|align="right" |+7.0%
|- align=right
| 
|align=left|ChristianUnion  (ChristenUnie, CU)
|align=left|Social-Christianity /Orthodox Protestantism
|align="left" |Gert-Jan Segers
|align="right" |
|align="right" |8.1%
|align="right" |-3.0%
|- align=right
| 
|align=left|Christian Democratic Appeal  (Christen-Democratisch Appèl, CDA)
|align=left|Christian Democracy
|align=left|Wopke Hoekstra
|align="right" |
|align="right" |7.8%
|align="right" |-6.0%
|- align=right
| 
|align=left|People's Party for Freedom and Democracy  (Volkspartij voor Vrijheid en Democratie, VVD)
|align=left|Conservative liberalism/Liberalism
|align=left|Mark Rutte
|align="right" |
|align="right" |1.7%
|align="right" |-0.1%
|- align=right
| 
|align=left|Democrats 66  (Democraten 66, D66)
|align=left|Social liberalism, Radicalism, Progressivism
|align="left" |Sigrid Kaag
|align="right" |
|align="right" |0.5%
|align="right" |0.0%
|- align=right
| 
|align=left|Party for the Animals  (Partij voor de Dieren, PvdD)
|align=left|Animal rights/Animal welfare
|align="left" |Esther Ouwehand
|align="right" |22
|align="right" |0.3%
|align="right" |+0.1%
|- align=right
| 
|align=left|Socialist Party  (Socialistische Partij, SP)
|align=left|Socialism
|align="left" |Lilian Marijnissen
|align="right" |
|align="right" |0.2%
|align="right" |-0.5%
|- align=right
| 
|align=left|GreenLeft  (GroenLinks, GL)
|align=left|Green Politics
|align="left" |Jesse Klaver
|align="right" |
|align="right" |0.2%
|align="right" |0.0%
|- align=right
| 
|align=left|Labour Party  (Partij van de Arbeid, PvdA)
|align=left|Social Democracy
|align=left|Lilianne Ploumen 
|align="right" |
|align="right" |0.2%
|align="right" |0.0%
|- align=right
|bgcolor="darkgray"|
|align=left|Other 
|align="left" |–
|align="left" |–
|align="right" |399
|align="right" |3.4%
|align="right" |+2.7%
|-
|align=left colspan=2 style="background-color:#E9E9E9"|Total
|width="30" align="right" style="background-color:#E9E9E9"|
|width="30" align="right" style="background-color:#E9E9E9"|
|width="75" align="right" style="background-color:#E9E9E9"|11,810
|width="30" align="right" style="background-color:#E9E9E9"|–
|width="30" align="right" style="background-color:#E9E9E9"|–
|-
|align=left colspan=2 style="background-color:#E9E9E9"|Turnout
|width="30" align="right" style="background-color:#E9E9E9"|
|width="30" align="right" style="background-color:#E9E9E9"|
|width="75" align="right" style="background-color:#E9E9E9"|10,094
|width="30" align="right" style="background-color:#E9E9E9"|82.72%
|width="30" align="right" style="background-color:#E9E9E9"|+2.80%
|-
|align="left" colspan=7|https://twitter.com/EuropeElects/status/1372346747402518529/photo/1
|}

Dialect 

One of the oldest and most distinctive dialects of Dutch is the language spoken in Urk. Nearly everyone in the village speaks this dialect and uses it in daily life. The dialect deviates considerably from contemporary standard Dutch and has preserved many old characteristics that disappeared from standard Dutch a long time ago. The Urkish dialect also includes elements that are older than standard Dutch and were never part of the standard language. The dialect developed this way because until World War II, Urk was an island and could only be reached by boat. Radio was unknown, and the poor population did not have much money for newspapers and books. Until the modern era primary education for the children typically lasted only two years; afterwards children had to help maintain the family and formal schooling ended.

Recent linguistic classifications have assigned the Urk dialect to the "Urkers dialect family", of which it is the only member.

The Urkish dialect has more vowel sounds than standard Dutch and each vowel has short and long forms. The pronunciation of vowels deviates from standard Dutch and is closer to English.

Because living conditions in Urk in historical times were very poor, young girls (typically about age 11 or 12) would frequently leave the island to become domestic servants, mostly in or around Amsterdam. They often served with Jewish families.  After a few years, they would return to Urk to form families of their own. As a result of this practice, the Urkish dialect absorbed some loanwords from the Amsterdam dialect and also from Yiddish. For instance, the Yiddish "Shnur" for "sister-in-law" became the Urkish "Snoar" (identical meaning); the Hebrew "Kallah" for "bride" became the Urkish "Kalletjen", meaning "girlfriend" (literally "little bride").

When Napoleon occupied the Netherlands, many French words were incorporated into both standard Dutch and Urkish.  Just as for standard Dutch, French words often changed form when incorporated into Urkish. The Urkish dialect has always been primarily a spoken language, and there are not many old texts written in the dialect. Only in recent years have people begun to write prose and poetry in the Urkish dialect. There are Urkers who have translated Bible books into Urkish, such as the book of Psalms.

Urk is no longer an island and exposure to the standard Dutch through the media is widespread. However, the distinctive Urkish dialect is still alive.

Notable people 

 A.C. Baantjer (1923 in Urk – 2010) a Dutch author of detective fiction and police officer
 Geert Nentjes, (born 1998), professional darts player, lives in Urk
 Jan Ras (born 1999 in Urk) a Dutch footballer who plays for SC Heerenveen
 Dick Schutte (born 1947 in Wilsum) a former Dutch politician, Mayor of Urk from 1999 to 2005
 
 Adri van Heteren (born 1951) a Dutch Christian minister in Urk

Folktales

Ommelebommelestien
A famous Urkish folktale is the story parents tell their children when they want to know where the babies come from. This stone is known as the "Ommelebommelestien". Urkers often tell their children that there are two kinds of people-- vreemden (strangers) and Urkers (people from Urk). Nowadays, the stone is usually called "Ommelebommelestien" (Ommel-Bommel Stone), but in former times it was called "Ommelmoerstien": moer means "mother's" in the Urkish dialect. In the tale, a stork comes all the way from Egypt to put babies in the stone. When the baby is about to be born, the baby's father is said to have to go to Schokland to pick up the key that gives access to the stone. So when an Urkish man is asked if he has been to Schokland, he is actually being asked if he has children. In the older days, when both Urk and Schokland were still islands in the Zuiderzee, the father had to take the obstetrician in his boat and row from Urk to Schokland to get the key, and then from Schokland to the Ommelebommelestien to get the baby. Nowadays he would be able to go to Schokland by car, but according to the legend he still has to row. The door to the stone is somewhere below sea level, so it is difficult to find. Once the door was found, a small price had to be paid for the baby: traditionally one Dutch guilder for a girl but two for a boy. The mother was said to be kept in bed with a nail through her right foot. There she would celebrate that she had just become a mother.

Urk and the arts 

The prolific Dutch writer Albert Cornelis Baantjer was born here. Baantjer is mainly known for his large series of detective novels revolving around police inspector De Cock and his side-kick, sergeant Vledder.

Writer Jef Last lived on Urk for several years from 1932 onwards. He wrote several articles about Urk for one of the most progressive Dutch magazines, 'De Groene Amsterdammer'. While living here, he fell in love with a fisherman, and was inspired to write Zuiderzee. This novel deals with the love between two fishermen living on Urk and was one of the first, if not the first novel in Dutch literature to openly deal with homosexuality.

The Dutch writer, painter and resistance hero Willem Arondeus spent some time in Urk from 1920. While residing on Urk, during 1922, he wrote 'Afzijdige Strofen', a collection of twenty homo-erotic poems which were posthumously published in 2001.

Demographics

Year 2018:
Birth Rate: 20.3 per 1000
Death Rate: 3.24 per 1000
NGR: +1.90% per year.

The birth rate of the municipality of Urk is the highest in the Netherlands as of 2016 (and highest in previous years). But like many other places in the Netherlands this number declined to 18.7% (down from 30.8% in 1988). In 1988 only Zeewolde had a slightly higher birth rate at 31.3%, but the birth rate Urk remained the second highest. The total fertility rate declined to 2.6 (down from 3.9 in 1988).

Rail Links

This makes Urk one of the most isolated places in the Netherlands as far as railway connections are concerned.

See also
Urk Lighthouse
Marken
Louise Kaiser, Urk language researcher

References

External links 
 
 
 Local news site
 Local lifeboat station

 
Former islands of the Netherlands
Former municipalities of North Holland
Former municipalities of Overijssel
Municipalities of Flevoland
Populated places in Flevoland